Milk Lake Glacier is located in the Glacier Peak Wilderness in the U.S. state of Washington. Milk Lake Glacier disappeared sometime between 1984 and 1997 and by 2005, Milk Lake was situated where the glacier had once been.

See also
List of glaciers in the United States

References

Glaciers of Glacier Peak
Glaciers of Washington (state)